The 2012 Canadian Senior Curling Championships were held from March 17 to 25 at the Abbotsford Recreation Centre in Abbotsford, British Columbia. British Columbia last hosted the Canadian Seniors in 2004, and has previously hosted 6 Canadian Senior men's championships and five Canadian Senior women's championships. The winners of the championships went on to represent Canada at the 2013 World Senior Curling Championships.

Men

Round Robin Standings
Final Round Robin Standings

Playoffs

Semifinal
Saturday, March 24, 7:00 pm

Final
Sunday, March 25, 11:00 am

Women

Round Robin Standings
Final Round Robin Standings

Playoffs

Semifinal
Saturday, March 24, 2:00 pm

Final
Sunday, March 25, 11:00 am

References

External links
Home Page

2012
Senior Curling Championships
Sport in Abbotsford, British Columbia
Curling competitions in British Columbia
2012 in British Columbia